Pallamana is a locality in the Murraylands region of South Australia between the Mount Lofty Ranges and the Murray River, northwest of Murray Bridge.

Transport
Pallamana is where the former Sedan railway line crosses Reedy Creek Road (state route B35) which connects Palmer to Murray Bridge. The former station/siding was originally named Preamimma Railway Station.

The Murray Bridge Airport is in the southeast of the locality of Pallamana. Another airfield named Rollo's Airfield  is on the western side of Pallamana.

Energy
RES Australia proposes to build a 176MW solar farm at Pallamana starting construction in Autumn 2020. It would be located south of the airport on 730 hectares of what had previously been open farmland. The solar farm would continue to be grazed by sheep between the solar panels.

References

Towns in South Australia